Cynthia Louise "Cindy" Brown (born March 16, 1965) is a retired American women's basketball player, at the college, Olympic and professional levels. Brown was a member of the USA Basketball team which went on to win a gold medal at the Pan American Games in Indianapolis, Indiana in 1987, and the gold medal at the 1988 Olympics in Seoul. She was also a member of the gold medal-winning team for the US at the 1985 World University Games, and the 1986 World Championship team.

College career
Born in Portland, Oregon, Brown played basketball for Long Beach State University between 1983 and 1987. As a senior, she set two NCAA scoring records—the most points in a single season (974) and the most points in a single game (60). The 60 point game was against  San Jose State,  a game Long Beach would win 149–69. Brown was a member of the Final Four All-Tournament team in 1987, and earned first team All-America honors in 1986 and 1987.

Long Beach State University statistics
Source

Professional career
Because the U.S. lacked a women's pro league, Brown played professionally in Europe and Japan for almost a decade. She played for:
 Sidis Ancona (Italy) 1987–1988
 Toshiba Yana Gi Cho (Japan) 1988–1992
 Faenza Errieti Club (Italy) 1992–1994
 Elizur Holon (Israel) 1994–1996

She was selected by the Seattle Reign in the second round of the ABL Draft on June 19, 1996. A 6'-1" center/power forward, a tenacious rebounder and a strong inside scoring presence, Brown earned Second Team All-ABL honors following the 1996–97 season. She was assigned to the site of her college success, the expansion Long Beach Stingrays on April 26, 1997. Before she ever reported to Long Beach, however, Brown signed with the rival WNBA.

The WNBA allocated Brown to the Detroit Shock prior to the 1998 season. In her first season with the Shock, she finished second in the WNBA in rebounding, and was named to the 1998 All-WNBA Second Team. Brown broke the Shock franchise record at Utah on August 10 by grabbing 21 rebounds in a game against Utah (a record which Cheryl Ford tied on June 22, 2003 at Connecticut, and which Ford broke on May 22, 2004 when she snagged 22 boards at San Antonio).

On July 29, 1999, midway through her second WNBA season, Brown was traded, along with Korie Hlede, to the Utah Starzz, for Wendy Palmer and Olympia Scott-Richardson. Brown played only 9 games for Utah, and retired from the WNBA following the 1999 season.

See also
 List of NCAA Division I women's basketball players with 2,500 points and 1,000 rebounds

References
General
 

Specific

External links 
 Long Beach State Hall of Fame bio
 WNBA Profile

1965 births
Living people
African-American basketball players
All-American college women's basketball players
American expatriate basketball people in Israel
American expatriate basketball people in Italy
American expatriate basketball people in Japan
American women's basketball players
Basketball players at the 1987 Pan American Games
Basketball players at the 1988 Summer Olympics
Basketball players from Portland, Oregon
Centers (basketball)
Detroit Shock players
Grant High School (Portland, Oregon) alumni
Long Beach State Beach women's basketball players
Medalists at the 1988 Summer Olympics
Olympic gold medalists for the United States in basketball
Pan American Games gold medalists for the United States
Pan American Games medalists in basketball
Parade High School All-Americans (girls' basketball)
Power forwards (basketball)
Seattle Reign (basketball) players
Universiade gold medalists for the United States
Universiade medalists in basketball
Utah Starzz players
Medalists at the 1985 Summer Universiade
Medalists at the 1987 Pan American Games
21st-century African-American people
21st-century African-American women
20th-century African-American sportspeople
20th-century African-American women
20th-century African-American people
United States women's national basketball team players